Burnzy's Last Call is a 1995 American comedy-drama film directed by Michael de Avila and starring Sherry Stringfield, Jamie Walters and Carolyn McCormick.

Cast
 Sam Gray as "Burnzy" Burns
 David Johansen as Andre
 James McCaffrey as Sal
 Carolyn McCormick as Danielle
 Chris Noth as Kevin
 Michael Rispoli as Chris, The Cop
 Roger Robinson as Russell
 Sherry Stringfield as Jackie
 Tony Todd as Mistress Marla
 Jamie Walters as Shannon
 Michael Massee as Luke
 Eddie Brill as Eugene

References

External links
 

1995 films
American comedy-drama films
1990s English-language films
1990s American films